The Balikpapan class is a ship class of eight heavy landing craft (officially Landing Craft, Heavy or LCH). All eight were originally laid down by Walkers Limited for the Australian Army in the early 1970s. A reorganisation of watercraft responsibilities in the Australian military meant the landing craft were to be operated by the Royal Australian Navy (RAN), with seven commissioned directly into RAN service during 1973 and 1974, and lead ship  transferred from the army to the navy. During the leadup to the independence of Papua New Guinea in 1975, two of the vessels ( and ) were transferred to the new Papua New Guinea Defence Force (PNGDF).

During their careers, the Australian vessels have operated in support of Operation Navy Help Darwin in 1974–1975, Operation Bel Isi from 1997 to 2003, INTERFET operations in 1999 and 2000, and RAMSI operations from 2003.

They are yet to be replaced in RAN service. As of 2013, the two PNGDF vessels were active, and in 2014, the former Labuan was transferred to Papua New Guinea as the training ship . Three additional units of the class - decommissioned units former HMAS Balikpapan, HMAS Wewak and HMAS Betano - were loaded on a transport ship in March 2016 for transport to the Philippine Navy.

Design and capabilities

Eight new heavy landing craft were ordered in 1969 as a locally manufactured replacement for the Australian Army's four LSM-1-class landing ship medium and two ALC 50 landing craft after the Landing Ship Medium Mark II project was cancelled. The landing craft have a standard displacement of 320 tons, with a full load displacement of 517 tons. They were originally built with two General Motors Detroit 12–71 diesel motors. These were replaced by Caterpillar 3406E diesel engines between 2005 and 2007 for those still in Australian service. The standard ship's company is 16-strong, including two officers. The sensor suite is limited to a Racel Decca Bridgemaster I-band navigational radar. They are fitted with two  machine guns for self-defence.

The LCHs have a maximum payload of 180 tons; equivalent to three Leopard 1 or two M1A1 Abrams tanks, 13 M113 armored personnel carriers, 23 quarter-tonne trucks, or four LARC-V amphibious cargo vehicles. As a troop transport, a Balikpapan class vessel can transport up to 400 soldiers between a larger amphibious ship and the shore, or embark 60 soldiers in six-berth caravans for longer voyages. The flat, box-like keel causes the ships to roll considerably in other-than-calm conditions, limiting their ability to make long voyages. The LCHs can mate their bow ramp to the stern loading dock of the RAN's large amphibious warfare ships when operating in the ship-to-shore role.

All eight Balikpapan-class vessels were constructed by Walkers Limited at their shipyard in Maryborough, Queensland. All were laid down during 1971 and 1972, with lead ship  entering service with the Australian Army Water Transport Squadron at the end of 1971. After this, responsibility for seagoing Army craft was transferred to the RAN, with the other seven craft directly entering naval service during 1973 and 1974, and Balikpapan transferring over in late 1974.

Operational history

Australian service

Five of the remaining Australian LCHs were deployed in December 1974 following Cyclone Tracy as part of Operation Navy Help Darwin;  was undergoing refits at the time.

 was assigned to the Royal Australian Navy Reserve in June 1979, and attached to the Brisbane Port Division. They were reactivated in 1988, 1990, and 2000, respectively. On entering service,  and  initially supplemented the inshore hydrographic survey capabilities of the RAN until late 1988, when they were reassigned to the naval base  for use in diver training. During May and June 1984, Balikpapan completed a  transit from Brisbane to Penang, transporting vehicles, equipment, and personnel to RAAF Butterworth; the longest ocean voyage undertaken by a vessel of this class.

Between 1997 and 2003, the LCHs were used to support the Peace Monitoring Group (PMG) in Bougainville, under Operation Bel Isi. Ships deployed on this operation were involved in resupplying the PMG base in Loloho, transport of PMG personnel and humanitarian aid, and coastal patrols. From 1999 onwards, the Balikpapans were also tasked with supporting INTERFET operations in East Timor, particularly those relating to the Oecussi enclave. The increase in operational tempo was a major factor in the reactivation of Wewak in 2000. In 2003, the landing craft began supporting RAMSI operations in the Solomon Islands.

On 11 December 2012, Wewak was decommissioned. Balikpapan and Betano were both decommissioned a day later, on 12 December. The other three Australian vessels were decommissioned on 20 November 2014.

Papua New Guinea

During 1985 and 1986, Salamaua and Buna underwent refits.

The two PNG vessels were listed in Jane's Fighting Ships as non-operational since 2011, and awaiting refits. By 2013, they had been returned to service. Labuan and Tarakan delivered humanitarian supplies to remote coastal settlements in the Solomon Islands in September 2014 as part of Australian support efforts in the region.

Philippines

Brunei and Tarakan were selected for donation to the Philippine Navy in January 2015. The intention was to improve the Philippines' sealift capability, which was found lacking following Typhoon Yolanda in 2013. The two landing craft were refurbished and fitted with new navigation and safety equipment, at a total cost of A$4 million. Hand-over of the vessel was originally planned for 17 May 2015, but this did not occur. The two landing craft sailed that day for the Philippines, with a formal christening ceremony to be held following their arrival in early August. It has been reported that the vessels will likely be homeported on the island of Palawan.

The Philippine and Australian governments are in negotiations to sell the three remaining Australian Balikpapans to the Philippine Navy, with a deal expected to be reached later in 2015. On 27 July 2015, Philippines president Benigno Aquino III stated as part of his annual state of the nation address that his government intended to purchase all three vessels. All three, the former HMAS Balikpapan, HMAS Wewak, and HMAS Betano, were delivered to the Philippines in March 2016, and were immediately sent for refurbishing works.

Replacement
There are plans to replace the Balikpapans in Australian service with an as-yet-unidentified class of six heavy landing craft. The original replacement project was not due to decide on the design until between 2016 and 2018, with the new class to enter service from 2022. The Department of Defence issued a request for information in early 2011, which may lead to the project being brought forward. As of 2019 there has been no further developments.

Citations

References

External links

Royal Australian Navy web page on Balikpapan class

 
Landing craft
Amphibious warfare vessel classes